Mohammad Reza Badamchi is an Iranian reformist politician who was a member of the Parliament of Iran from 2016 to 2020 representing Tehran, Rey, Shemiranat and Eslamshahr electoral district.

Career 
Badamchi was human resources manager at the Iran Tractor Manufacturing Company and a senior official at East Azerbaijan Province governate. He is one of the members Fraction of Turkic regions

Electoral history

References

Living people
Members of the 10th Islamic Consultative Assembly
Islamic Labour Party politicians
Year of birth missing (living people)